XX Trianguli, abbreviated XX Tri, is a variable star in the northern constellation of Triangulum, about 1.5° to the WNW of Beta Trianguli along the constellation border with Andromeda. It is classified as a RS Canum Venaticorum variable and ranges in brightness from magnitude 8.1 down to 8.7, which is too faint to be visible to the naked eye. The system is located at a distance of approximately 642 light years from the Sun based on parallax, but is drifting closer with a radial velocity of −26 km/s.

This is a single-lined spectroscopic binary with an orbital period of 23.96924 days. The visible component is an orange-hued K-type giant star with a stellar classification of K0 III, indicating it has exhausted the supply of hydrogen at its core then cooled and expanded off the main sequence. It is around eight billion years old with 26% more mass than the Sun and has expanded to 11 times the Sun's radius. It is radiating roughly 30 times the luminosity of the Sun from its photosphere at an effective temperature of 4,620 K.

The star is "covered with large high-latitude and even polar spots and with occasional small equatorial spots". XX Tri is notable for having a huge starspot larger than the diameter of the Sun, discovered using Doppler imaging. For its size, the star has a relatively rapid rotation rate of about 24 days. It has a weak, Sun-like differential rotation.

References

K-type giants
RS Canum Venaticorum variables
Spectroscopic binaries

Triangulum (constellation)
BD+34 0363
3130
012545
009630
Trianguli, XX